Kemijärven maalaiskunta is a former municipality in Finland.

Consolidated to Kemijärvi in 1973.

References

Former municipalities of Finland